May I Come In Madam? is a Hindi-language Indian  sitcom television series which premiered on 7 March 2016 on Life OK. The series ended on 25 August 2017 as the channel got closed.

Plot

Season 1
A young man, Sajan Agarwal, is dejected after being constantly henpecked by his wife. However, he is smitten by his good-looking boss Sanjana and seeks her attention. Sajan Agarwal is mentally tortured by his mother-in-law Ramvati and brother-in-law Bhupesh. Slowly, Sajan falls in Love with Sanjana and his friend Khiloni knows it. It Shows how Sajan is Stuck between His Office Love and wife.

Cast

 Sandeep Anand as Sajan Agarwal (Sanju); Ramvati's son-in-law, Kashmira's husband; Bhupesh's brother-in-law; Khiloni's friend; Sajana's employee and ex-boyfriend
 Neha Pendse as Sanjana Hiteshi (Madam); Chedilal's daughter, Sajan's boss and Ex-girlfriend
Sapna Sikarwar as Kashmira Agarwal and the possessed Dadi; Ramvati's daughter; Bhupesh's brother; Sajan's wife
 Shoma Rathod as Ramvati, Sajan's mother-in-law.
 Anup Upadhyay as Mr. Chedilal Hiteshi; the chairman of Use Me Advertising and Peon Chedi without glasses; Sajana's father
 Melissa Pais as TV Program Presenter Kaamini
 Deepesh Bhan as Bhupesh; Ramvati's son; Kashmira's brother; Sajan's brother-in-law
 Vaibhav Mathur as Rajkishore, Sajan's neighbour
 Feroz (actor) as Vegetable Seller
 Saheb Das Manikpuri as Khiloni, Sajan's best friend
 Satish Kaushik as Boby Aggarwal, Sajan's uncle

Production
In January and April 2017, the set caught fire, in both cases following explosions in high-intensity lights. The producers stated in press releases that no one had been injured.

Reception
By October 2016, after six months of broadcast, the series was one of the top-running shows on Life Ok and had a TRP of 0.9.But the second season of the show aired on Star Bharat .It was totally flop and was replaced by Durga - Mata Ki Chhaya.

Sequel
The producers of the show launched a sequel titled Excuse Me Maadam, which revolves around a similar concept and storyline, however changes were made in the cast as it features Rajesh Kumar as Sanam Harjayi, Nyra Banerjee as Sanam's boss and Sucheta Khanna as Sanam's caring wife. Sapna Sikarwar and Anup Upadhyay are also part of the series. Anup Upadhyay portrays Adhu, who is Sanam's best friend and husband of his sister-in-law Amar, played by Sapna Sikarwar.

References

External links 
 View on IMDB on IMDb
 View Episodes on hotstar

2010s sitcoms
2020s sitcoms
Indian comedy television series